Hülya Şenyurt (born November 10, 1973 in Ordu) is a Turkish female judoka.  She won the women's bronze medal in Judo (under 48 kg) in the 1992 Summer Olympics. She became Turkey's first female and youngest Olympic medalist.

Between 1989 and 1992, Hülya Şenyurt was successful at Balkan and  European Junior's Judo Championships.

Achievements
 1989 Balkan Juniors Judo Championships in İzmir, Turkey – bronze
 1990 European Juniors Judo Championships in İzmir, Turkey – gold
 1991 European Juniors Judo Championships – silver
 1992 Summer Olympics in Barcelona, Spain – bronze

External links
 Who is who  

1973 births
Living people
Sportspeople from Ordu
Turkish female judoka
Olympic judoka of Turkey
Olympic bronze medalists for Turkey
Judoka at the 1992 Summer Olympics
Judoka at the 1996 Summer Olympics
Olympic medalists in judo

Medalists at the 1992 Summer Olympics
20th-century Turkish sportswomen
21st-century Turkish sportswomen